The Absolutely Very Best of Peter Combe (So Far) Recorded in Concert' is the first live album by Australian children's musician Peter Combe. It was recorded in 1990 and released in April 1991 and peaked at number 69 on the ARIA Charts. The album was certified gold in December 1991.

At the ARIA Music Awards of 1992, the album won the ARIA Award for Best Children's Album; the third time Combe has won this award.

Track listing
 "This Little Pig" - 3:53
 "Spangle Road" - 2:38
 "Jeffrey Hill" - 2:45
 "Thelma Brown" - 3:25
 "The Put It Song" - 2:03
 "Rain" - 3:02
 "Rock 'n' Roll Is All You Need" - 2:19
 "Lullaby (For Tom)" - 2:11
 "Tadpole Blues" - 3:17
 "Down in the Bathroom" - 5:36
 "Toffee Apple" - 2:40
 "Music of the Day" - 3:31
 "Saturday Night" - 2:22
 "Tell Me The Ti-i-ime Please" - 3:47
 "Cats" - 2:17
 "Chopsticks" - 2:57
 "Jack and the Beanstalk" - 3:22
 "Cast Away" - 2:22
 "Happy As Larry" - 2:44
 "Mr. Clicketty Cane" - 2:46
 "Spaghetti Bolognaise" - 2:31
 "Juicy, Juicy Green Grass (A Sheep's Lament)" - 2:56
 "Newspaper Mama" - 4:26

All songs composed, arranged and produced by Peter Combe.

Charts

Certifications

Release history

References

1991 live albums
Peter Combe albums
ARIA Award-winning albums
Live albums by Australian artists